Fothriff or Fothrif was a province of Scotland in the Middle Ages. It is often paired with Fife, not only in De Situ Albanie, but also in early charters.

The exact extent of early Fothriff is unclear, but in around 1300 the Deanery of Fothriff in the Bishopric of St Andrews included both Clackmannan and Kinross, as well as Fife from the parishes of Auchtermuchty, Lathrisk, Cults, Kirkforthar Markinch and Methil westwards.

Etymology 
The name Fothriff was recorded in the 11th century as Fotriffe and may ultimately be of Brittonic origin. The name is derived from *vo-treb, meaning "sub-settlement" (> Welsh godref).

See also
 Mormaerdom of Fife

References

 Broun, Dauvit, "The Seven Kingdoms in De Situ Albanie: A Record of Pictish political Geography or imaginary map of ancient Alba ?" in E.J.Cowan & R. Andrew McDonald (eds), Alba: Celtic Scotland in the Medieval Era. Reprinted, Edinburgh: John Donald, 2005. 
 McNeill, Peter G.B. & MacQueen, Hector L. (eds), Atlas of Scottish History to 1707. Edinburgh: Trustees of the Scottish Medievalists and the Department of Geography, University of Edinburgh, 1996. 

Medieval Scotland
Geographic history of Scotland